Mukesh Gadhvi (1 January 1963 – 1 March 2013) was an Indian politician and a senior member of Indian National Congress. He was a one-time Member of Parliament (MP) from Banaskantha and three-time Member of Legislative Assembly (MLA) from Danta. He was born in Jhanker Village Sirohi, Rajasthan, he  was son of Congress leader  B.K. Gadhvi, three time MP from the Banaskantha seat, and remained Union Minister of State for Finance during the Rajiv Gandhi ministry and had remained the President of Gujarat Pradesh Congress Committee (GPCC).

He died on 1 March 2013 at age  50, after suffering a brain  stroke, a few days earlier. He is survived by his wife, one son and two daughters.

References 

1963 births
2013 deaths
Indian National Congress politicians
Lok Sabha members from Gujarat
People from Banaskantha district
India MPs 2009–2014

Charan
Gujarat MLAs 1998–2002
Gujarat MLAs 2002–2007
Gujarat MLAs 2007–2012
Gadhavi (surname)
Indian National Congress politicians from Gujarat